is a Japanese talent agency headquartered in Chuo-ku, Osaka. It was founded in 1958 under the conglomerate Shochiku Co., Ltd and focuses on talent management for comedians and tarento. The agency mainly associates itself with acts and entertainment under the Kamigata culture.

Notable talents

Comedians

Groups
America Zarigani (Tetsuya Yanagihara, Yoshiyuki Hirai)
Masuda Okada (Hidehiko Masuda, Keisuke Okada)
TKO (Takehiro Kimoto, Takayuki Kinoshita)
Yasuda Dai Circus (Yasuda Dancho, Kuro-chan, HIRO)
Yoiko (Masaru Hamaguchi, Shinya Arino)

Solo
Kintalo
Buruma Konno
Kenji Moriwaki
Shōfukutei Tsurube II

Other tarento
Chiemi Hori (singer, actress)
Atsushi Oyagi (former rugby player)
Masakatsu Funaki (actor, wrestler)

Former talents
Othello (Tomoko Nakajima, Mahomi Matsushima)

References

External links 
 Official website

Entertainment companies of Japan
Japanese talent agencies
Mass media companies established in 1958
1958 establishments in Japan
Shochiku